Virtu Ferries is a Maltese company founded in 1988 that operates ferry services from Malta to Sicily by catamaran. It has a subsidiary Venezia Lines which runs seasonal services from Venice. It carries over 250,000 passengers and 25,000 vehicles annually. In 2010 the  replaced the Maria Dolores as the flagship, and it carries about 800 passengers and 200 vehicles. It operates the Valletta - Pozzallo route across the Malta Channel, almost daily all-year round. Virtu Ferries currently operates exclusively catamarans. All vessels fly the Maltese flag.

List of catamarans

Venezia Lines
Venezia Lines is a subsidiary which operates various services in the Adriatic Sea. It was founded in 2001 and ran its first service in May 2003. It runs a six-month seasonal service between April and October on the following routes in the North Adriatic:

Venice - Piran
Venice - Poreč
Venice - Pula
Venice - Rabac
Venice - Rovinj

References

 
Ferry companies of Italy
Ferry companies of Malta
Catamarans